Karlos Zenon Balderas Jr. (born August 24, 1996) is an American boxer who competed at the 2016 Summer Olympics held in Rio de Janeiro, Brazil.

Personal life
Balderas was born on May 24, 1996, in Lompoc, California. He was the first member of his family to be born in the United States; his grandfather first came to California, leaving his wife and children behind in Oaxaca, Mexico, to work in strawberry fields, eventually earning the money to move the rest of the family to the United States. Whilst growing up in Santa Maria, California, Balderas was first taken to a boxing gym as a punishment for fighting in the streets with his friends and getting suspended from school. His older brother Jose is also a boxer.

Career
Balderas is coached by his father Zenon and his uncle David.

In December 2014, Balderas won the lightweight division of the US National Team Trials, qualifying him for the 2015 Pan American Games held in Toronto, Ontario, Canada, where he received a first round bye and was defeated in the quarterfinals by Lindolfo Delgado of Mexico.
Balderas represented the USA Knockouts in the World Series of Boxing (WSB). In 2015 he took part in five bouts, defeating Fabio Introvaia of Italy, Dawid Michelus of Poland, Brian Nunez of Argentina and Adrian Javier Martinez Morales of Puerto Rico but losing to Azerbaijan's Albert Selimov. In 2016 he won his first two bouts against Lindolfo Delgado and Moroccan Hamza Rabii.

He qualified for the men's lightweight event at the 2016 Summer Olympics in Rio de Janeiro Brazil via his results in the WSB where he won the gold medal in his elite division and was named Outstanding Boxer of the event. Balderas was given his Olympic allocation by the International Boxing Association (AIBA) after two of the athletes ahead of him in the final WSB rankings instead qualified for the Olympics through the 2015 World Championships. Balderas won his first two Olympic matches but lost in the quarterfinals to Cuban finalist Lázaro Álvarez. On April 9, 2017, he won his pro debut by first-round TKO.

Professional boxing record

References

External links
 
 
 
 

1997 births
Living people
People from Santa Maria, California
American male boxers
Lightweight boxers
Olympic boxers of the United States
Boxers at the 2016 Summer Olympics
Boxers at the 2015 Pan American Games
American boxers of Mexican descent
Pan American Games competitors for the United States